Banayoyo, officially the Municipality of Banayoyo, is a 4th class municipality in the province of Ilocos Sur, Philippines. According to the 2020 census, it has a population of 7,931 people.

Settlements in the municipality are mostly established along the roads and in the areas near the people's sources of livelihood. With limited economic opportunities in the municipality, some residents of the town have also left their town to seek higher education, better employment opportunities, better opportunities for trade and commerce not only to other more developed areas in the country but even abroad.

Etymology
The municipality of Banayoyo was originally called “Bacsayan”. How it got its present name could be recounted by the following story: in the eastern part of Poblacion, there was a big tree, which was called “Banayoyo”. The people built a “Dap-ay” under the shady branches of the big tree, where the old folks held their meetings and settled any disputes or criminal acts committed by the barangay folks. After every bountiful harvest, the people gathered around the “Banayoyo” tree and offered their thanksgiving in a festivity called “Kaniaw”, the rituals lasting for three days.

Due to old age, the big “Banayoyo” tree died. The death of the big tree brought famine and drought. The calamity prompted the older folks to gather in the “Dap-ay” and decided to change the name of the community. The people thought of a name so that the big “Banayoyo” tree will always be remembered, and called the place “Banayoyo” instead of “Bacsayan”.

History

Creation of the municipality

In its earliest stage, Banayoyo was a “rancheria” (or a pasture land under the Spanish regime). But as more people from the highlands of Abra called “Tinguians” came to settle, it developed into a small community.

Before Banayoyo became a township, during the 18th century, it was part of the now municicpalities of Candon and Santiago. Reliable sources indicate that lands existing in the southern part of the town, particularly from Barangay Cadanglaan in the south-west to the Barangay Lopez in the Southeast, were registered in the local civil registrar at Candon, while lands in the northern part were also registered in the local civil registrar at Santiago before they were given new declarations by the local civil registrar of Banayoyo. It was only in the year 1907 when Banayoyo gained its township, separating itself from Candon and Santiago. In 1912, it became a Municipality under Ilocos Sur Province.

World War II
During World War II, Banayoyo was once the seat of ongoing local Philippine Commonwealth Military and Ilocano Guerilla Resistance Outfit, under the command of Army Major Walter M. Cushing, a fearless American fighter. The closeness of the residents to the Guerilla Outfit by way of provisions and financial assistance irked the Japanese Imperial Army, who were then garrisoned at an old Sugar Central in nearby Bucong, a barrio of Candon. Angry patrols of the Japanese Imperial Army burned down some barrios of Banayoyo. Barangay Elefante, which was the bivouac area of the elements of the “M” Company, 121st Infantry Regiment, Philippine Commonwealth Army, USAFIP NL, suffered the worst atrocities. On October 16, 1944, one half of the barrio was burned down and on November 14, 1944, the other half met the same fate. During the same dates, not only Elefante was set on fire but the whole town. The Banayoyo Catholic Church was not spared nor the Municipal Hall.

Geography
The municipality of Banayoyo is one of the 32 municipalities of Ilocos Sur. It is bounded on the south by the Bucong River, also called “Carayan a Bassit”; on the west by a small canal called “Calip”; on the east by the Cabcaburao Hills, and on the north by Bay-asan Hills. Municipalities abutting the town area are: on the east by Lidlidda; on the south by Candon; on the west by Santiago; and on the north by Burgos.

The municipality can be reached by jeepneys going to Lidlidda and San Emilio or tricycles from Candon.

Barangays
Banayoyo is politically subdivided into 14 barangays. These barangays are headed by elected officials: Barangay Captain, Barangay Council, whose members are called Barangay Councilors. All are elected every three years.

 Bagbagotot
 Banbanaal
 Bisangol
 Cadanglaan
 Casilagan Norte
 Casilagan Sur
 Elefante
 Guardia
 Lintic
 Lopez
 Montero
 Naguimba
 Pila
 Poblacion

Climate

Demographics

In the 2020 census, Banayoyo had a population of 7,931.

Religion
Many religions have been established in the municipality like Protestantism, Catholicism, Iglesia ni Cristo, Aglipayan, Jehovah's Witnesses. Many residents have been given elementary and secondary education with the establishment of several elementary schools.

Economy

Government
Banayoyo, belonging to the second congressional district of the province of Ilocos Sur, is governed by a mayor designated as its local chief executive and by a municipal council as its legislative body in accordance with the Local Government Code. The mayor, vice mayor, and the councilors are elected directly by the people through an election which is being held every three years.

Elected officials

Socio-Economic-Cultural Development
Tinguians were the foremost inhabitants of the place, who came down from the highlands of Abra. With the coming of the Spaniards, Americans, Japanese, Chinese and other foreigners and people from nearby provinces of Ilocos Norte, La Union and Mountain Province, the original settlers intermingled with and intermarried with them,. At present, however, remnants of the Tinguian tribe still reside in the town.

Like before, farming is the major source of livelihood of the people. During the early period, they used crude methods of farming like plowing by the use of cows and carabaos, and tilling the soil by the hands or sticks. But with the coming of the Westerners who brought with them modern technologies, the farmers of Banayoyo have already adopted semi-mechanized methods of farming like the use of tractors, threshers, commercial fertilizers, etc.

References

External links
Pasyalang Ilocos Sur
Philippine Standard Geographic Code
Philippine Census Information
Local Governance Performance Management System

Municipalities of Ilocos Sur